The Ambassador of the United Kingdom to the Democratic Republic of Congo is the United Kingdom's foremost diplomatic representative in the Democratic Republic of Congo (DRC), and head of the UK's diplomatic mission in Kinshasa.

From 1968 to 1987, and since 1991, the British ambassador to the DRC has also been non-resident ambassador to the neighbouring Republic of Congo.

List of heads of mission

Ambassador Extraordinary and Plenipotentiary
1960–1961: Ian Dixon Scott
1961–1963: Derek Riches
1963–1965: Michael Rose
1965–1969: John Cotton
1969–1971: Paul Wright
1971–1974: Mark Allen
1974–1977: Richard Stratton
1977–1980: Alan Donald
1980–1983: John Snodgrass
1983–1984: Nicholas Bayne
1985–1987: Patrick Eyers
1987–1991: Robert Cormack
1991–1992: Roger Westbrook
1992–1996: No ambassador
1996–1998: Marcus Hope
1998–2000: Douglas Scrafton
2000–2004: James Atkinson
2004–2007: Andrew Sparkes
2007–2009: Nicholas Kay
2010–2013: Neil Wigan
2013–2014: Diane Corner
2014–2015: Timothy Morris (temporary)
2015–2017: Graham Zebedee
2017–2020: John Murton

2020–present: Emily Maltman

References

External links
UK and Congo, gov.uk

Congo, Democratic Republic of
 
United Kingdom
 
United Kingdom